Lakemba railway station is located on the Bankstown line, serving the Sydney suburb of Lakemba. It is served by Sydney Trains T3 Bankstown line services.

History
Lakemba station opened on 14 April 1909 when the Bankstown line was extended from Belmore to Bankstown.

Previously a shunting neck existed to the west of the station allowing services to terminate at Lakemba. This was removed in the 1990s. The original wooden ticket office above the station was demolished after it was heavily damaged by fire and replaced by a modern metal and glass structure in 2001.

War Memorial
A war memorial was opened outside the station on 19 April 1953 by State Governor John Northcott.

Platforms & services

Transport links
Punchbowl Bus Company operates four routes via Lakemba station:
450: Strathfield to Hurstville station
942: Campsie to Lugarno
946: Bankstown to Roselands
S14: to Mount Lewis

Lakemba station is served by one NightRide route:
N40: East Hills station to Town Hall station

References

External links

Lakemba station details Transport for New South Wales
Lakemba Metro station Sydney Metro

City of Canterbury-Bankstown
Easy Access railway stations in Sydney
Railway stations in Sydney
Railway stations in Australia opened in 1909
Bankstown railway line